The Kwilu River is a major river in the Kwilu Province formerly known as Bandundu province in the Democratic Republic of the Congo (DRC) to the city of Bandundu, where it joins the Kwango River just before this stream enters the Kasai River. In the DRC the river flows past the towns of Gungu, Kikwit, Bulungu, Bagata, Rutherfordia and Bandundu.
Lusanga, formerly Leverville, lies at the location where the Kwenge River joins the Kwilu, between Kikwit and Bulungu.

Characteristics 
It is a meandering river. Near its mouth it is 950 meters wide. The bed material is sand.
A 2011 survey found 113 species of fish in 21 families and eight orders.

References

Sources

Rivers of Angola
Rivers of the Democratic Republic of the Congo
International rivers of Africa